Lieutenant-General Roelf Beukes  is a retired South African military commander.  He joined the South African Air Force in 1969 and later served as Chief of the Air Force.

Military career
Beukes attended the South African Military Academy from 1966 to 1969. He completed the Senior Command and Staff Course at the Chilean Air War Academy, Santiago, from 1979 to 1980. He remained in Chile to serve as a pilot instructor.

Aircraft Flown
During his career he flew the following aircraft: 
Harvard
De Havilland Vampire
Sabre
Impala
Mirage III
Cheetah D

Awards and honours
 
 
 
 
 
 
 
 
 Chilean Air Force Merit Medal

References

|-

Living people
White South African people
South African military personnel of the Border War
Chiefs of the South African Air Force
Year of birth missing (living people)